Abbasabad (also Romanized as ‘Abbāsābād) is a village in Khomeh Rural District, in the Central District of Aligudarz County, Lorestan Province, Iran. At the 2006 census, its population was 133, in 23 families.

References 

Towns and villages in Aligudarz County